Dundrum may refer to:

Places

Republic of Ireland
Dundrum, Dublin, a suburb of Dublin city
Dundrum, County Tipperary, a village

Northern Ireland
Dundrum, County Down, a village
Dundrum Bay, next to the County Down village 
Dundrum, County Armagh, a townland in County Armagh

Other uses
Dundrum Castle, in the County Down village 
Dundrum meteorite, fell near the County Tipperary village
Dundrum Town Centre, a shopping centre in Dublin